Yisrael Galili (born Yisrael Balashnikov; 23 October 1923 – 9 March 1995) was an Israeli weapons designer, best known for designing the Galil assault rifle. He also helped to create the Uzi submachine gun. He was known in the military by the nickname 'Father of the Rifle'.

Early life
Born in Mandatory Palestine on October 26, 1923, Galili served in the British Army in World War II. Following his discharge, he volunteered to work with the Haganah in weapons manufacture.

Galil rifle
During the Six-Day War in 1967, the Israelis captured many AK-47 assault rifles from the Egyptian soldiers which proved more reliable and useful in the arid conditions against the FN FAL. Inspired by the AK-47, the IDF assessed it thoroughly and began the process of designing a new automatic rifle for which the task was assigned to two groups: one led by Uziel Gal, the designer of the Uzi submachine gun, & Yisrael Galili (Balashnikov) together with Yakov Lior invented the Galil assault rifle which was named after him. Tests were conducted from the end of the 1960s to the early 1970s led to Galili's rifle emerging as the winner, as a result Galil was adopted by the military. The Galil assault rifle heavily derives most of the features from Kalashnikov AK-47. In 1973, he received the Israel Defense Prize for this achievement.

Death
Yisrael Galili died on March 9, 1995.

See also
R4 assault rifle

References 

20th-century Israeli inventors
1923 births
1995 deaths
Firearm designers
Israel Defense Prize recipients
Burials at Yarkon Cemetery
British Army personnel of World War II